Viorel Nicoară (born 27 September 1987) is a Romanian footballer who plays as a midfielder.

Career 

Viorel Nicoară, a product of Unirea Urziceni academy, started his senior career at Tineretului Stadium, but he failed to make a single appearance. He was loaned to CSM Râmnicu Sărat, and in 2008 sold to Victoria Brăneşti.

He won the promotion to Liga I with Victoria Brăneşti at his team's first Liga II season. During the 2009–10 season, he was called by the Romania national football team coach Răzvan Lucescu to the under-23 squad, alongside his team-mate Vasile Olariu.

He made his debut with the full Romanian team in August 2011, playing the last seven minutes of a friendly match against San Marino.

Honours

CFR Cluj 
 Liga I winner (2011–12)

Pandurii Târgu Jiu 
 Liga I runner-up (2012–13)

Victoria Brăneşti 
 Liga II winner (2009–10)

References

External links 

1987 births
Living people
Footballers from Bucharest
Romanian footballers
Association football midfielders
Liga I players
FC Unirea Urziceni players
CS Brănești players
CFR Cluj players
CS Pandurii Târgu Jiu players
FC Astra Giurgiu players
ASC Daco-Getica București players
ACS Viitorul Târgu Jiu players
CS Sportul Snagov players
Romania international footballers
Romanian expatriate footballers
Romanian expatriate sportspeople in Israel
Expatriate footballers in Israel